Praboo T. Arivanathan, known as Praboo Ariva, is a Malaysian screenwriter and film director. He became the youngest film director in Malaysia by directing the 2015 film KID. Praboo has stated that he intends to pursue film studies in the United States of America.

Filmography
 2013 -The Step (Short Film)
 2015 -KID

References

External links 
 

Living people
Malaysian film directors
Malaysian people of Indian descent
Year of birth missing (living people)